Nahal Toosi is an American journalist and currently foreign affairs correspondent for Politico, who in 2011 was one of the first reporters to reach Abbottabad, Pakistan, after the death of Osama bin Laden and in 2018 covered the Rohingya refugee crisis.

Background
Nahal Toosi was born in Tehran, Iran.  Her family immigrated to the United States when she was six years old.  She graduated valedictorian from McKinney High School in McKinney, Texas. In 2000, she received a BA from the University of North Carolina at Chapel Hill, where she reported and edited for the student-run The Daily Tar Heel.

Career
Toosi worked for the Milwaukee Journal Sentinel on topics from higher education to foreign correspondence from Iraq (including the US invasion in 2003), Egypt, Thailand, and Germany. In 2005, she joined the Associated Press, where she was both reporter and editor based in: New York, Islamabad, Kabul, and London. In 2011, she was one of the first foreign correspondents to reach Abbottabad, Pakistan, after the killing of Osama bin Laden.  In 2013, she joined Politico, where she is now foreign affairs correspondent.

She has contributed to Rohingya Crisis project at the Pulitzer Center. She has spoken publicly at the College of William & Mary and on news shows including: CBS News, WNYC, WAMU, KCRW, and Wisconsin Public Radio.

Works
 Politico
 Associated Press (via Washington Examiner)
 Associated Press (via Daily Star)

References

https://www.politico.com/news/2022/07/09/israel-winner-after-biden-meeting-with-saudi-crown-prince-00044789?cid=apn

External links
 CBS News
 C-SPAN
 WNYC
 MuckRack

Living people
21st-century American writers
Politico people
People from Tehran
People from McKinney, Texas
UNC Hussman School of Journalism and Media alumni
American women journalists
Year of birth missing (living people)
21st-century American women
21st-century American journalists